The Birmingham Barracudas were a Canadian football team that played the 1995 season in the Canadian Football League. The Barracudas were part of a failed attempt to expand the CFL into the United States.

Franchise history

In the beginning
Insurance tycoon, former high school football coach and motivational speaker Art Williams was awarded a CFL expansion franchise in Birmingham. He wanted a nickname for the team that would "scare the spit out of people," and chose Barracudas.

The Barracudas hired an experienced head coach in Jack Pardee, who had coached at the college level with the University of Houston and at the professional level with the WFL, USFL, and NFL. (Pardee is perhaps better known as one of the few six-man football players to have ever made it to the professional leagues; his knowledge of that wide-open game proved to serve him well in the similarly wide-open CFL.) The Barracudas were also led by veteran CFL quarterback Matt Dunigan, who had his greatest season while in Birmingham.

During the season
Birmingham competed in the Southern Division along with the San Antonio Texans, Baltimore Stallions, Memphis Mad Dogs, and Shreveport Pirates. After losing their two pre-season games, they played their first game July 4, 1995, versus the Winnipeg Blue Bombers in Winnipeg. They won 38–10, and would lose to the Tiger-Cats in Hamilton 31–13. They would get their revenge a week later at home by beating the Cats 51–28 in front of 31,000 fans.

The biggest home game of the season came against the Baltimore Stallions. It also proved to be the biggest disappointment, as the Barracudas lost 36–8.

Attendance at Legion Field was very good at first. The Birmingham crowds were some of the largest in the league.  However, the CFL traditionally plays on Thursdays, Fridays and Saturdays, largely to avoid competing on television (both in its native country and the U.S.) with the National Football League.  Realizing that this would cause serious attendance problems once high school and college football season started, Williams persuaded the league to let the 'Cudas play their September and October home games on Sundays so as not to compete directly against high school teams on Fridays and Alabama or Auburn on Saturdays. Because Alabamians in general are not loyal to any one NFL team, Williams reckoned that competing with that league on television was the more sensible risk to take. Despite this, attendance still fell through the floor as most Birmingham-area fans stayed home to watch the NFL on TV. Their last four home games did not attract more than 9,000 people, and looked even smaller than that since Legion Field seated over 83,000 people at the time. The Memphis Mad Dogs were plagued by similar attendance problems.

In the team's final home game, against the Edmonton Eskimos, Matt Dunigan left the game due to a shoulder injury, and Birmingham was forced to turn to back-up quarterback Jimmy Klingler. Despite the loss, the Barracudas still had a chance to claim home-field advantage in the playoffs. However, they lost a shootout of a season finale in San Antonio, finishing third in the Southern Division. They returned to San Antonio the following week for the Southern Division Semi-Final, but were whipped by the Texans 52–9, ending their first and only playoff run.

After the season
Owner Art Williams estimated that he had spent $10 million to launch the Barracudas, and had probably lost at least that, if not more, during the season. He also began criticizing the Canadian Football League, and its unique concept. Along with other U.S. owners, Williams wanted several changes made:

Reducing the size of a CFL field to American football standards.
Allowing only 11 players on each side of the ball, rather than 12.
Changing the name of the league to show more of a U.S. presence.

The biggest change Williams wanted, however, was to move the season to the spring; he was not willing to risk another season of going head-to-head with college football.  When the league refused to go along, Williams decided to get out.  A day after losing in the South semifinals, he announced that the 'Cudas would not return to Birmingham in 1996, if they returned at all.  In January 1996, he sold the team for $750,000—a significant loss, based on his own estimates—to a group of investors called Ark-La-Tex Football Association, who intended to move the team to Shreveport as a replacement for the Shreveport Pirates, who had collapsed under the mismanagement of infamous CFL owner Bernard Glieberman.  The Pirates had been barely competitive on the field (winning only eight games in two years) and hamstrung by Glieberman off it, but nevertheless had managed to attract a fairly consistent and numerous fan base comparable with the established CFL teams that didn't disappear when college football season started.  Although Shreveport was far smaller than Birmingham, it was thought that moving the 'Cudas there would match a team that had made a good showing in its first season with a market that was at least potentially capable of supporting it. The relocation, which hinged upon league approval, would have been part of a plan to keep at least three American teams in the CFL by concentrating the American teams in the Southwest: the Baltimore Stallions would have moved to Houston, while the San Antonio Texans would stay where they were.

By the end of January, it became clear that the league was no longer interested in playing in the United States. The league rejected the sale of the Barracudas and ordered them shut down. The Stallions ownership group was concurrently awarded the remains of the inactive Montreal Alouettes franchise, which started play in 1996. Without a second American team, Anderson was unwilling to go it alone and folded the Texans, ending the CFL's American experiment.  Williams would go on to purchase the Tampa Bay Lightning of the National Hockey League in 1998, and sell the club a year later.

Seasons

Players and builders of note 
  Scott Player (played 10 years in the NFL and 1 year in the UFL)
  Shonte Peoples
  Reggie Slack
  Luis Zendejas

Canadian Football Hall of Famers
  Freddie Childress
  Eddie Davis
  Matt Dunigan

See also
 CFL USA all-time records and statistics
Comparison of Canadian and American football
1995 CFL season

References

External links
 Birmingham Barracudas at BhamWiki.com 
 Birmingham Barracudas at BirminghamProSports.com
 Birmingham Barracudas team profile
 Uniforms

 
Defunct Canadian Football League teams
American football teams in Birmingham, Alabama
Defunct American football teams in Alabama
Defunct Canadian football teams in the United States
1995 establishments in Alabama
1995 disestablishments in Alabama